Year 137 (CXXXVII) was a common year starting on Monday (link will display the full calendar) of the Julian calendar. At the time, it was known as the Year of the Consulship of Caesar and Balbinus (or, less frequently, year 890 Ab urbe condita). The denomination 137 for this year has been used since the early medieval period, when the Anno Domini calendar era became the prevalent method in Europe for naming years.

Events 
 By place 

 Roman Empire 
 Tax laws are passed for trade in Palmyra.  The caravan city grows rich by importing rare products from the Persian Gulf, and by exporting items manufactured by the Mediterranean world to the East.

Births 
 Didius Julianus, Roman emperor (according to Historia Augusta) (d. 193)
 Shi Xie, Chinese official, ruler of Jiaozhi (d. 226)
 Wang Yun, Chinese official, politician (d. 192)

Deaths 
 Telesphorus of Rome

References